Laguna Beach, California is a city in Orange County, California, United States.

Laguna Beach may also refer to:
 Laguna Beach, Florida, a town in Bay County, Florida
 Laguna Beach: The Real Orange County, a reality TV program that aired on MTV (2004–2006)
 Lagoon-A-Beach, a water park in Laagoon amusement park in Farmington, Utah

See also
 Laguna (disambiguation)